This is a list of diplomatic missions of Costa Rica. Costa Rica is one of the more developed countries in Latin America, and has a moderate sized number of diplomatic missions abroad.

Current missions

Africa

 Nairobi (Embassy)

Americas

 Buenos Aires (Embassy)

 La Paz (Embassy)

 Brasília (Embassy)

 Ottawa (Embassy)
 Toronto (Consulate-General)

 Santiago (Embassy)

 Bogotá (Embassy)

 Havana (Embassy)

 Santo Domingo (Embassy)

 Quito (Embassy)

 San Salvador (Embassy)

 Guatemala City (Embassy)

 Tegucigalpa (Embassy)

 Kingston (Embassy)

 Mexico City (Embassy)

 Managua (Embassy)

 Panama City (Embassy)
 David (Consulate)

 Asunción (Embassy)

 Lima (Embassy)

 Washington, D.C. (Embassy)
 Atlanta (Consulate-General)
 Chicago (Consulate-General)
 Houston (Consulate-General)
 Los Angeles (Consulate-General)
 Miami (Consulate-General)
 New York (Consulate-General)
 San Juan (Consulate-General)

 Montevideo (Embassy)

Asia

 Beijing (Embassy)
 Shanghai (Consulate-General)

 New Delhi (Embassy)

 Jakarta (Embassy)

 Tel Aviv (Embassy)

 Tokyo (Embassy)

 Doha (Embassy)

 Singapore (Embassy)

 Seoul (Embassy)

 Ankara (Embassy)

 Abu Dhabi (Embassy)

Europe

 Vienna (Embassy)

 Brussels (Embassy)

 Paris (Embassy)

 Berlin (Embassy)

 Rome (Embassy)

 Rome (Embassy)

 The Hague (Embassy)

 Moscow (Embassy)

 Madrid (Embassy)

 Bern (Embassy)

 London (Embassy)

Oceania

 Canberra (Embassy)

Multilateral organisations
Geneva (Permanent Mission to the United Nations and other international organisations)
New York (Permanent Mission to the United Nations)
Washington, D.C. (Permanent Mission to the OAS)

Gallery

Closed missions

Americas

Asia

Europe

Oceania

Multilateral organizations

See also
Foreign relations of Costa Rica
List of diplomatic missions in Costa Rica
Visa policy of Costa Rica

Notes

References
 Ministry of Foreign Affairs of Costa Rica

 
Diplomatic missions
Costa Rica